Thomas Tyler "T.T." Terry (1865–1941) was an American politician who served as mayor of Huntsville, Alabama, from 1916 to 1918. He was the first leader of the city to actually bear the title "Mayor". Previously, the city's chief executive had been titled "President".  He is buried at Maple Hill Cemetery in Huntsville.

References

1865 births
1941 deaths
Mayors of Huntsville, Alabama
People from Madison County, Alabama